Christopher "Chris" Hale (birth unknown) is a former professional rugby league footballer who played in the 1980s. He played at club level for Featherstone Rovers (Heritage № 617).

Playing career
Christopher Hale made his début for Featherstone Rovers on Sunday 3 November 1985.

References

Living people
English rugby league players
Featherstone Rovers players
Place of birth missing (living people)
Rugby league halfbacks
Year of birth missing (living people)